

Africa

President – Abdelaziz Bouteflika, President of Algeria (1999–2019)
Prime Minister –
Ahmed Ouyahia, Prime Minister of Algeria (2003–2006)
Abdelaziz Belkhadem, Prime Minister of Algeria (2006–2008)

President – José Eduardo dos Santos, President of Angola (1979–2017)
Prime Minister – Fernando da Piedade Dias dos Santos, Prime Minister of Angola (2002–2008)

President –
Mathieu Kérékou, President of Benin (1996–2006)
Thomas Boni Yayi, President of Benin (2006–2016)

President – Festus Mogae, President of Botswana (1998–2008)

President – Blaise Compaoré, President of Burkina Faso (1987–2014)
Prime Minister – Paramanga Ernest Yonli, Prime Minister of Burkina Faso (2000–2007)

President – Pierre Nkurunziza, President of Burundi (2005–2020)

President – Paul Biya, President of Cameroon (1982–present)
Prime Minister – Ephraïm Inoni, Prime Minister of Cameroon (2004–2009)

President – Pedro Pires, President of Cape Verde (2001–2011)
Prime Minister – José Maria Neves, Prime Minister of Cape Verde (2001–2016)

President – François Bozizé, President of the Central African Republic (2003–2013)
Prime Minister – Élie Doté, Prime Minister of the Central African Republic (2005–2008)

President – Idriss Déby, President of Chad (1990–2021)
Prime Minister – Pascal Yoadimnadji, Prime Minister of Chad (2005–2007)

President –
Azali Assoumani, President of the Comoros (2002–2006)
Ahmed Abdallah Mohamed Sambi, President of the Comoros (2006–2011)

President – Denis Sassou Nguesso, President of the Republic of the Congo (1997–present)
Prime Minister – Isidore Mvouba, Prime Minister of the Republic of the Congo (2005–2009)
 
President – Joseph Kabila, President of the Democratic Republic of the Congo (2001–2019)
Prime Minister – Antoine Gizenga, Prime Minister of the Democratic Republic of the Congo (2006–2008)

President – Ismaïl Omar Guelleh, President of Djibouti (1999–present)
Prime Minister – Dileita Mohamed Dileita, Prime Minister of Djibouti (2001–2013)

President – Hosni Mubarak, President of Egypt (1981–2011)
Prime Minister – Ahmed Nazif, Prime Minister of Egypt (2004–2011)

President – Teodoro Obiang Nguema Mbasogo, President of Equatorial Guinea (1979–present)
Prime Minister –
Miguel Abia Biteo Boricó, Prime Minister of Equatorial Guinea (2004–2006)
Ricardo Mangue Obama Nfubea, Prime Minister of Equatorial Guinea (2006–2008)

President – Isaias Afwerki, President of Eritrea (1991–present)

President – Girma Wolde-Giorgis, President of Ethiopia (2001–2013)
Prime Minister – Meles Zenawi, Prime Minister of Ethiopia (1995–2012)

President – Omar Bongo, President of Gabon (1967–2009)
Prime Minister –
Jean-François Ntoutoume Emane, Prime Minister of Gabon (1999–2006)
Jean Eyeghé Ndong, Prime Minister of Gabon (2006–2009)

President – Yahya Jammeh, President of the Gambia (1994–2017)

President – John Kufuor, President of Ghana (2001–2009)

President – Lansana Conté, President of Guinea (1984–2008)
Prime Minister – Cellou Dalein Diallo, Prime Minister of Guinea (2004–2006)

President – João Bernardo Vieira, President of Guinea-Bissau (2005–2009)
Prime Minister – Aristides Gomes, Prime Minister of Guinea-Bissau (2005–2007)

President – Laurent Gbagbo, President of the Ivory Coast (2000–2011)
Prime Minister – Charles Konan Banny, Prime Minister of the Ivory Coast (2005–2007)

President – Mwai Kibaki, President of Kenya (2002–2013)
 
Monarch – Letsie III, King of Lesotho (1996–present)
Prime Minister – Pakalitha Mosisili, Prime Minister of Lesotho (1998–2012)

Head of State –
Gyude Bryant, Chairman of the Transitional Government of Liberia (2003–2006)
Ellen Johnson Sirleaf, President of Liberia (2006–2018)

De facto Head of State – Muammar Gaddafi, Guide of the Revolution of Libya (1969–2011)
De jure Head of State – Muhammad az-Zanati, General Secretary of the General People's Congress of Libya (1992–2008)
Prime Minister –
Shukri Ghanem, General Secretary of the General People's Committee of Libya (2003–2006)
Baghdadi Mahmudi, General Secretary of the General People's Committee of Libya (2006–2011)

President – Marc Ravalomanana, President of Madagascar (2002–2009)
Prime Minister – Jacques Sylla, Prime Minister of Madagascar (2002–2007)

President – Bingu wa Mutharika, President of Malawi (2004–2012)

President – Amadou Toumani Touré, President of Mali (2002–2012)
Prime Minister – Ousmane Issoufi Maïga, Prime Minister of Mali (2004–2007)

Head of State – Ely Ould Mohamed Vall, Chairman of the Military Council for Justice and Democracy of Mauritania (2005–2007)
Prime Minister – Sidi Mohamed Ould Boubacar, Prime Minister of Mauritania (2005–2007)

President – Sir Anerood Jugnauth, President of Mauritius (2003–2012)
Prime Minister – Navin Ramgoolam, Prime Minister of Mauritius (2005–2014)
  (overseas collectivity of France)
Prefect – Jean-Paul Kihl, Prefect of Mayotte (2005–2007)
Head of Government – Saïd Omar Oili, President of the General Council of Mayotte (2004–2008)

Monarch – Mohammed VI, King of Morocco (1999–present)
Prime Minister – Driss Jettou, Prime Minister of Morocco (2002–2007)
 (self-declared, partially recognised state)
President – Mohamed Abdelaziz, President of Western Sahara (1976–2016)
Prime Minister – Abdelkader Taleb Omar, Prime Minister of Western Sahara (2003–2018)

President – Armando Guebuza, President of Mozambique (2005–2015)
Prime Minister – Luísa Diogo, Prime Minister of Mozambique (2004–2010)

President – Hifikepunye Pohamba, President of Namibia (2005–2015)
Prime Minister – Nahas Angula, Prime Minister of Namibia (2005–2012)

President – Mamadou Tandja, President of Niger (1999–2010)
Prime Minister – Hama Amadou, Prime Minister of Niger (2000–2007)

President – Olusegun Obasanjo, President of Nigeria (1999–2007)

President – Paul Kagame, President of Rwanda (2000–present)
Prime Minister – Bernard Makuza, Prime Minister of Rwanda (2000–2011)
 (Overseas Territory of the United Kingdom)
Governor – Michael Clancy, Governor of Saint Helena (2004–2007)

President – Fradique de Menezes, President of São Tomé and Príncipe (2003–2011)
Prime Minister –
Maria do Carmo Silveira, Prime Minister of São Tomé and Príncipe (2005–2006)
Tomé Vera Cruz, Prime Minister of São Tomé and Príncipe (2006–2008)

President – Abdoulaye Wade, President of Senegal (2000–2012)
Prime Minister – Macky Sall, Prime Minister of Senegal (2004–2007)

President – James Michel, President of Seychelles (2004–2016)

President – Ahmad Tejan Kabbah, President of Sierra Leone (1998–2007)

President – Abdullahi Yusuf Ahmed, President of Somalia (2004–2008)
Prime Minister – Ali Mohammed Ghedi, Prime Minister of Somalia (2004–2007)
 Islamic Courts Union (rival administration, controlling Mogadishu and parts of southern Somalia)
Chairman – Sheikh Sharif Ahmed, Executive Chairman of the Islamic Courts Union (2006)
 (unrecognised, secessionist state)
President – Dahir Riyale Kahin, President of Somaliland (2002–2010)
 (self-declared autonomous state)
President – Mohamud Muse Hersi, President of Puntland (2005–2009)

President – Thabo Mbeki, President of South Africa (1999–2008)

President – Omar al-Bashir, President of Sudan (1989–2019)

Monarch – Mswati III, King of Swaziland (1986–present)
Prime Minister – Themba Dlamini, Prime Minister of Swaziland (2003–2008)

President – Jakaya Kikwete, President of Tanzania (2005–2015)
Prime Minister – Edward Lowassa, Prime Minister of Tanzania (2005–2008)

President – Faure Gnassingbé, President of Togo (2005–present)
Prime Minister –
Edem Kodjo, Prime Minister of Togo (2005–2006)
Yawovi Agboyibo, Prime Minister of Togo (2006–2007)

President – Zine El Abidine Ben Ali, President of Tunisia (1987–2011)
Prime Minister – Mohamed Ghannouchi, Prime Minister of Tunisia (1999–2011)

President – Yoweri Museveni, President of Uganda (1986–present)
Prime Minister – Apolo Nsibambi, Prime Minister of Uganda (1999–2011)

President – Levy Mwanawasa, President of Zambia (2002–2008)

President – Robert Mugabe, President of Zimbabwe (1987–2017)

Asia

President – Hamid Karzai, President of Afghanistan (2002–2014)

Monarch – Sheikh Hamad bin Isa Al Khalifa, King of Bahrain (1999–present)
Prime Minister – Sheikh Khalifa bin Salman Al Khalifa, Prime Minister of Bahrain (1970–2020)

President – Iajuddin Ahmed, President of Bangladesh (2002–2009)
Prime Minister –
Khaleda Zia, Prime Minister of Bangladesh (2001–2006)
Iajuddin Ahmed, Chief Adviser of Bangladesh (2006–2007)

Monarch –
Jigme Singye Wangchuck, King of Bhutan (1972–2006)
Jigme Khesar Namgyel Wangchuck, King of Bhutan (2006–present)
Prime Minister –
Sangay Ngedup, Prime Minister of Bhutan (2005–2006)
Khandu Wangchuk, Prime Minister of Bhutan (2006–2007)

Monarch – Hassanal Bolkiah, Sultan of Brunei (1967–present)
Prime Minister – Hassanal Bolkiah, Prime Minister of Brunei (1984–present)

Monarch – Norodom Sihamoni, King of Cambodia (2004–present)
Prime Minister – Hun Sen, Prime Minister of Cambodia (1985–present)

Communist Party Leader – Hu Jintao, General Secretary of the Chinese Communist Party (2002–2012)
President – Hu Jintao, President of China (2003–2013)
Premier – Wen Jiabao, Premier of the State Council of China (2003–2013)

President – Xanana Gusmão, President of East Timor (2002–2007)
Prime Minister –
Mari Alkatiri, Prime Minister of East Timor (2001–2006)
José Ramos-Horta, Prime Minister of East Timor (2006–2007)

President – A. P. J. Abdul Kalam, President of India (2002–2007)
Prime Minister – Manmohan Singh, Prime Minister of India (2004–2014)

President – Susilo Bambang Yudhoyono, President of Indonesia (2004–2014)

Supreme Leader – Ayatollah Ali Khamenei, Supreme Leader of Iran (1989–present)
President – Mahmoud Ahmadinejad, President of Iran (2005–2013)

Head of State – Presidency Council of Iraq
Members –
Jalal Talabani (2005–2006; President of Iraq, 2005–2006), and Adil Abdul-Mahdi and Ghazi Mashal Ajil al-Yawer (2005–2006)
Jalal Talabani (2006–2010; President of Iraq, 2006–2010), and Adil Abdul-Mahdi and Tariq al-Hashimi (2006–2010)
Prime Minister –
Ibrahim al-Jaafari, Prime Minister of Iraq (2005–2006)
Nouri al-Maliki, Prime Minister of Iraq (2006–2014)

President – Moshe Katsav, President of Israel (2000–2007)
Prime Minister –
Ariel Sharon, Prime Minister of Israel (2001–2006)
Ehud Olmert, Prime Minister of Israel (2006–2009)
 (non-state administrative authority)
President – Mahmoud Abbas, President of the Palestinian National Authority (2005–present)
Prime Minister –
Ahmed Qurei, Prime Minister of the Palestinian National Authority (2005–2006)
Ismail Haniyeh, Prime Minister of the Palestinian National Authority (2006–2007)

Monarch – Akihito, Emperor of Japan (1989–2019)
Prime Minister –
Junichirō Koizumi, Prime Minister of Japan (2001–2006)
Shinzō Abe, Prime Minister of Japan (2006–2007)

Monarch – Abdullah II, King of Jordan (1999–present)
Prime Minister – Marouf al-Bakhit, Prime Minister of Jordan (2005–2007)

President – Nursultan Nazarbayev, President of Kazakhstan (1990–2019)
Prime Minister – Daniyal Akhmetov, Prime Minister of Kazakhstan (2003–2007)

Communist Party Leader – Kim Jong-il, General Secretary of the Workers' Party of Korea (1997–2011)
De facto Head of State – Kim Jong-il, Chairman of the National Defence Commission of North Korea (1993–2011)
De jure Head of State – Kim Yong-nam, Chairman of the Presidium of the Supreme People's Assembly of North Korea (1998–2019)
Premier – Pak Pong-ju, Premier of the Cabinet of North Korea (2003–2007)

President – Roh Moo-hyun, President of South Korea (2003–2008)
Prime Minister –
Lee Hae-chan, Prime Minister of South Korea (2004–2006)
Han Duck-soo, Acting Prime Minister of South Korea (2006)
Han Myeong-sook, Prime Minister of South Korea (2006–2007)

Monarch –
Sheikh Jaber Al-Ahmad Al-Sabah, Emir of Kuwait (1977–2006)
Sheikh Saad Al-Salim Al-Sabah, Emir of Kuwait (2006)
Sheikh Sabah Al-Ahmad Al-Jaber Al-Sabah, Emir of Kuwait (2006–2020)
Prime Minister –
Sheikh Sabah Al-Ahmad Al-Jaber Al-Sabah, Prime Minister of Kuwait (2003–2006)
Sheikh Nasser Al-Sabah, Prime Minister of Kuwait (2006–2011)

President – Kurmanbek Bakiyev, President of Kyrgyzstan (2005–2010)
Prime Minister – Felix Kulov, Prime Minister of Kyrgyzstan (2005–2007)

Communist Party Leader –
Khamtai Siphandon, General Secretary of the Lao People's Revolutionary Party (1992–2006)
Choummaly Sayasone, General Secretary of the Lao People's Revolutionary Party (2006–2016)
President –
Khamtai Siphandon, President of Laos (1998–2006)
Choummaly Sayasone, President of Laos (2006–2016)
Premier –
Bounnhang Vorachith, Chairman of the Council of Ministers of Laos (2001–2006)
Bouasone Bouphavanh, Chairman of the Council of Ministers of Laos (2006–2010)

President – Émile Lahoud, President of Lebanon (1998–2007)
Prime Minister – Fouad Siniora, President of the Council of Ministers of Lebanon (2005–2009)

Monarch –
Tuanku Sirajuddin, Yang di-Pertuan Agong of Malaysia (2001–2006)
Tuanku Mizan Zainal Abidin, Yang di-Pertuan Agong of Malaysia (2006–2011)
Prime Minister – Abdullah Ahmad Badawi, Prime Minister of Malaysia (2003–2009)

President – Maumoon Abdul Gayoom, President of the Maldives (1978–2008)

President – Nambaryn Enkhbayar, President of Mongolia (2005–2009)
Prime Minister –
Tsakhiagiin Elbegdorj, Prime Minister of Mongolia (2004–2006)
Miyeegombyn Enkhbold, Prime Minister of Mongolia (2006–2007)

Head of State – Than Shwe, Chairman of the State Peace and Development Council of Myanmar (1992–2011)
Prime Minister – Soe Win, Prime Minister of Myanmar (2004–2007)

Monarch – Gyanendra, King of Nepal (2001–2008)
Prime Minister –
Gyanendra, Prime Minister of Nepal (2005–2006)
Girija Prasad Koirala, Prime Minister of Nepal (2006–2008)

Monarch – Qaboos bin Said al Said, Sultan of Oman (1970–present)
Prime Minister – Qaboos bin Said al Said, Prime Minister of Oman (1972–present)

President – Pervez Musharraf, President of Pakistan (2001–2008)
Prime Minister – Shaukat Aziz, Prime Minister of Pakistan (2004–2007)

President – Gloria Macapagal Arroyo, President of the Philippines (2001–2010)

Monarch – Sheikh Hamad bin Khalifa Al Thani, Emir of Qatar (1995–2013)
Prime Minister – Sheikh Abdullah bin Khalifa Al Thani, Prime Minister of Qatar (1996–2007)

Monarch – Abdullah, King of Saudi Arabia (2005–2015)
Prime Minister – Abdullah, Prime Minister of Saudi Arabia (2005–2015)

President – S. R. Nathan, President of Singapore (1999–2011)
Prime Minister – Lee Hsien Loong, Prime Minister of Singapore (2004–present)

President – Mahinda Rajapaksa, President of Sri Lanka (2005–2015)
Prime Minister – Ratnasiri Wickremanayake, Prime Minister of Sri Lanka (2005–2010)

President – Bashar al-Assad, President of Syria (2000–present)
Prime Minister – Muhammad Naji al-Otari, Prime Minister of Syria (2003–2011)

President – Chen Shui-bian, President of Taiwan (2000–2008)
Premier –
Frank Hsieh, President of the Executive Yuan of Taiwan (2005–2006)
Su Tseng-chang, President of the Executive Yuan of Taiwan (2006–2007)

President – Emomali Rahmonov, President of Tajikistan (1992–present)
Prime Minister – Oqil Oqilov, Prime Minister of Tajikistan (1999–2013)

Monarch – Bhumibol Adulyadej, King of Thailand (1946–2016)
Prime Minister –
Thaksin Shinawatra, Prime Minister of Thailand (2001–2006)
Chitchai Wannasathit, Acting Prime Minister of Thailand (2006)
Thaksin Shinawatra, Prime Minister of Thailand (2006)
Surayud Chulanont, Prime Minister of Thailand (2006–2008)
Junta Leader – Sonthi Boonyaratglin, Chief of the Administrative Reform Council of Thailand (2006–2007)

President – Ahmet Necdet Sezer, President of Turkey (2000–2007)
Prime Minister – Recep Tayyip Erdoğan, Prime Minister of Turkey (2003–2014)

President –
Saparmurat Niyazov, President of Turkmenistan (1990–2006)
Gurbanguly Berdimuhamedow, President of Turkmenistan (2006–2022)

President – Sheikh Khalifa bin Zayed Al Nahyan, President of the United Arab Emirates (2004–present)
Prime Minister –
Sheikh Maktoum bin Rashid Al Maktoum, Prime Minister of the United Arab Emirates (1990–2006)
Sheikh Mohammed bin Rashid Al Maktoum, Prime Minister of the United Arab Emirates (2006–present)

President – Islam Karimov, President of Uzbekistan (1990–2016)
Prime Minister – Shavkat Mirziyoyev, Prime Minister of Uzbekistan (2003–2016)

Communist Party Leader – Nông Đức Mạnh, General Secretary of the Communist Party of Vietnam (2001–2011)
President –
Trần Đức Lương, President of Vietnam (1997–2006)
Nguyễn Minh Triết, President of Vietnam (2006–2011)
Prime Minister –
Phan Văn Khải, Prime Minister of Vietnam (1997–2006)
Nguyễn Tấn Dũng, Prime Minister of Vietnam (2006–2016)

President – Ali Abdullah Saleh, President of Yemen (1978–2012)
Prime Minister – Abdul Qadir Bajamal, Prime Minister of Yemen (2001–2007)

Europe

President – Alfred Moisiu, President of Albania (2002–2007)
Prime Minister – Sali Berisha, Prime Minister of Albania (2005–2013)

Monarchs –
French Co-Prince – Jacques Chirac, French Co-prince of Andorra (1995–2007)
Co-Prince's Representative – Philippe Massoni (2002–2007)
Episcopal Co-Prince – Joan Enric Vives Sicília, Episcopal Co-prince of Andorra (2003–present)
Co-Prince's Representative – Nemesi Marqués Oste (1993–2012)
Prime Minister – Albert Pintat, Head of Government of Andorra (2005–2009)

President – Robert Kocharyan, President of Armenia (1998–2008)
Prime Minister – Andranik Margaryan, Prime Minister of Armenia (2000–2007)

President – Heinz Fischer, Federal President of Austria (2004–2016)
Chancellor – Wolfgang Schüssel, Federal Chancellor of Austria (2000–2007)

President – Ilham Aliyev, President of Azerbaijan (2003–present)
Prime Minister – Artur Rasizade, Prime Minister of Azerbaijan (2003–2018)
 (unrecognised, secessionist state)
President – Arkadi Ghukasyan, President of Nagorno-Karabakh (1997–2007)
Prime Minister – Anushavan Danielyan, Prime Minister of Nagorno-Karabakh (1999–2007)

President – Alexander Lukashenko, President of Belarus (1994–present)
Prime Minister – Sergei Sidorsky, Prime Minister of Belarus (2003–2010)

Monarch – Albert II, King of the Belgians (1993–2013)
Prime Minister – Guy Verhofstadt, Prime Minister of Belgium (1999–2008)

Head of State – Presidency of Bosnia and Herzegovina
Serb Member –
Borislav Paravac (2003–2006)
Nebojša Radmanović (2006–2014; Chairman of the Presidency of Bosnia and Herzegovina, 2006–2007)
Bosniak Member –
Sulejman Tihić (2002–2006; Chairman of the Presidency of Bosnia and Herzegovina, 2006)
Haris Silajdžić (2006–2010)
Croat Member –
Ivo Miro Jović (2005–2006; Chairman of the Presidency of Bosnia and Herzegovina, 2005–2006)
Željko Komšić (2006–2014)
Prime Minister – Adnan Terzić, Chairman of the Council of Ministers of Bosnia and Herzegovina (2002–2007)
High Representative –
Lord (Paddy) Ashdown, High Representative for Bosnia and Herzegovina (2002–2006)
Christian Schwarz-Schilling, High Representative for Bosnia and Herzegovina (2006–2007)

President – Georgi Parvanov, President of Bulgaria (2002–2012)
Prime Minister – Sergei Stanishev, Prime Minister of Bulgaria (2005–2009)

President – Stjepan Mesić, President of Croatia (2000–2010)
Prime Minister – Ivo Sanader, Prime Minister of Croatia (2003–2009)
 
President – Tassos Papadopoulos, President of Cyprus (2003–2008)
 (unrecognised, secessionist state)
President – Mehmet Ali Talat, President of Northern Cyprus (2005–2010)
Prime Minister – Ferdi Sabit Soyer, Prime Minister of Northern Cyprus (2005–2009)

President – Václav Klaus, President of the Czech Republic (2003–2013)
Prime Minister –
Jiří Paroubek, Prime Minister of the Czech Republic (2005–2006)
Mirek Topolánek, Prime Minister of the Czech Republic (2006–2009)

Monarch – Margrethe II, Queen of Denmark (1972–present)
Prime Minister – Anders Fogh Rasmussen, Prime Minister of Denmark (2001–2009)

President –
Arnold Rüütel, President of Estonia (2001–2006)
Toomas Hendrik Ilves, President of Estonia (2006–2016)
Prime Minister – Andrus Ansip, Prime Minister of Estonia (2005–2014)

President – Tarja Halonen, President of Finland (2000–2012)
Prime Minister – Matti Vanhanen, Prime Minister of Finland (2003–2010)

President – Jacques Chirac, President of France (1995–2007)
Prime Minister – Dominique de Villepin, Prime Minister of France (2005–2007)

President – Mikheil Saakashvili, President of Georgia (2004–2007)
Prime Minister – Zurab Noghaideli, Prime Minister of Georgia (2005–2007)
 (unrecognised, secessionist state)
President – Sergei Bagapsh, President of Abkhazia (2005–2011)
Prime Minister – Alexander Ankvab, Prime Minister of Abkhazia (2005–2010)
 (unrecognised, secessionist state)
President – Eduard Kokoity, President of South Ossetia (2001–2011)
Prime Minister – Yury Morozov, Prime Minister of South Ossetia (2005–2008)

President – Horst Köhler, Federal President of Germany (2004–2010)
Chancellor – Angela Merkel, Federal Chancellor of Germany (2005–2021)

President – Karolos Papoulias, President of Greece (2005–2015)
Prime Minister – Kostas Karamanlis, Prime Minister of Greece (2004–2009)

President – László Sólyom, President of Hungary (2005–2010)
Prime Minister – Ferenc Gyurcsány, Prime Minister of Hungary (2004–2009)

President – Ólafur Ragnar Grímsson, President of Iceland (1996–2016)
Prime Minister –
Halldór Ásgrímsson, Prime Minister of Iceland (2004–2006)
Geir Haarde, Prime Minister of Iceland (2006–2009)

President – Mary McAleese, President of Ireland (1997–2011)
Prime Minister – Bertie Ahern, Taoiseach of Ireland (1997–2008)
 
President –
Carlo Azeglio Ciampi, President of Italy (1999–2006)
Giorgio Napolitano, President of Italy (2006–2015)
Prime Minister –
Silvio Berlusconi, President of the Council of Ministers of Italy (2001–2006)
Romano Prodi, President of the Council of Ministers of Italy (2006–2008)

President – Vaira Vīķe-Freiberga, President of Latvia (1999–2007)
Prime Minister – Aigars Kalvītis, Prime Minister of Latvia (2004–2007)

Monarch – Hans-Adam II, Prince Regnant of Liechtenstein (1989–present)
Regent – Hereditary Prince Alois, Regent of Liechtenstein (2004–present)
Prime Minister – Otmar Hasler, Head of Government of Liechtenstein (2001–2009)

President – Valdas Adamkus, President of Lithuania (2004–2009)
Prime Minister –
Algirdas Brazauskas, Prime Minister of Lithuania (2001–2006)
Zigmantas Balčytis, Acting Prime Minister of Lithuania (2006)
Gediminas Kirkilas, Prime Minister of Lithuania (2006–2008)

Monarch – Henri, Grand Duke of Luxembourg (2000–present)
Prime Minister – Jean-Claude Juncker, Prime Minister of Luxembourg (1995–2013)

President – Branko Crvenkovski, President of Macedonia (2004–2009)
Prime Minister –
Vlado Bučkovski, President of the Government of Macedonia (2004–2006)
Nikola Gruevski, President of the Government of Macedonia (2006–2016)

President – Eddie Fenech Adami, President of Malta (2004–2009)
Prime Minister – Lawrence Gonzi, Prime Minister of Malta (2004–2013)

President – Vladimir Voronin, President of Moldova (2001–2009)
Prime Minister – Vasile Tarlev, Prime Minister of Moldova (2001–2008)
 (unrecognised, secessionist state)
President – Igor Smirnov, President of Transnistria (1990–2011)

Monarch – Albert II, Sovereign Prince of Monaco (2005–present)
Prime Minister – Jean-Paul Proust, Minister of State of Monaco (2005–2010)

the 1992 Republic declared independence from the State Union of Serbia and Montenegro on 3 June
President – Filip Vujanović, President of Montenegro (2002–2018)
Prime Minister –
Milo Đukanović, Prime Minister of Montenegro (2003–2006)
Željko Šturanović, Prime Minister of Montenegro (2006–2008)

Monarch – Beatrix, Queen of the Netherlands (1980–2013)
 (constituent country of the Kingdom of the Netherlands)
Prime Minister – Jan Peter Balkenende, Prime Minister of the Netherlands (2002–2010)
 (constituent country of the Kingdom of the Netherlands)
see 
 (constituent country of the Kingdom of the Netherlands)
see 

Monarch – Harald V, King of Norway (1991–present)
Prime Minister – Jens Stoltenberg, Prime Minister of Norway (2005–2013)

President – Lech Kaczyński, President of Poland (2005–2010)
Prime Minister –
Kazimierz Marcinkiewicz, Chairman of the Council of Ministers of Poland (2005–2006)
Jarosław Kaczyński, Chairman of the Council of Ministers of Poland (2006–2007)

President –
Jorge Sampaio, President of Portugal (1996–2006)
Aníbal Cavaco Silva, President of Portugal (2006–2016)
Prime Minister – José Sócrates, Prime Minister of Portugal (2005–2011)

President – Traian Băsescu, President of Romania (2004–2014)
Prime Minister – Călin Popescu-Tăriceanu, Prime Minister of Romania (2004–2008)

President – Vladimir Putin, President of Russia (1999–2008)
Prime Minister – Mikhail Fradkov, Chairman of the Government of Russia (2004–2007)

Captains-Regent –
Claudio Muccioli and Antonello Bacciocchi, Captains Regent of San Marino (2005–2006)
Gianfranco Terenzi and Loris Francini, Captains Regent of San Marino (2006)
Antonio Carattoni and Roberto Giorgetti, Captains Regent of San Marino (2006–2007)

the State Union dissolved into both the Republic of Serbia and the Republic of Montenegro on 5 June
President – Svetozar Marović, President of Serbia and Montenegro (2003–2006)
Prime Minister – Svetozar Marović, Prime Minister of Serbia and Montenegro (2003–2006)

the 1990 Republic declared independence from the State Union of Serbia and Montenegro on 5 June
President – Boris Tadić, President of Serbia (2004–2012)
Prime Minister – Vojislav Koštunica, President of the Government of Serbia (2004–2008)
Kosovo (Self-Governing Entity under UN administration)
President –
Ibrahim Rugova, President of Kosovo (2002–2006)
Nexhat Daci, Acting President of Kosovo (2006)
Fatmir Sejdiu, President of Kosovo (2006–2010)
Prime Minister –
Bajram Kosumi, Prime Minister of Kosovo (2005–2006)
Agim Çeku, Prime Minister of Kosovo (2006–2008)
UN Special Representative –
Søren Jessen-Petersen, Special Representative of the UN Secretary-General for Kosovo (2004–2006)
Steven P. Schook, Acting Special Representative of the UN Secretary-General for Kosovo (2006)
Joachim Rücker, Special Representative of the UN Secretary-General for Kosovo (2006–2008)

President – Ivan Gašparovič, President of Slovakia (2004–2014)
Prime Minister –
Mikuláš Dzurinda, Prime Minister of Slovakia (1998–2006)
Robert Fico, Prime Minister of Slovakia (2006–2010)

President – Janez Drnovšek, President of Slovenia (2002–2007)
Prime Minister – Janez Janša, Prime Minister of Slovenia (2004–2008)

Monarch – Juan Carlos I, King of Spain (1975–2014)
Prime Minister – José Luis Rodríguez Zapatero, President of the Government of Spain (2004–2011)

Monarch – Carl XVI Gustaf, King of Sweden (1973–present)
Prime Minister –
Göran Persson, Prime Minister of Sweden (1996–2006)
Fredrik Reinfeldt, Prime Minister of Sweden (2006–2014)

Council – Federal Council of Switzerland
Members – Moritz Leuenberger (1995–2010; President of Switzerland, 2006), Pascal Couchepin (1998–2009), Joseph Deiss (1999–2006), Samuel Schmid (2000–2008), Micheline Calmy-Rey (2002–2011), Christoph Blocher (2003–2007), Hans-Rudolf Merz (2003–2010), and Doris Leuthard (2006–present)

President – Viktor Yushchenko, President of Ukraine (2005–2010)
Prime Minister –
Yuriy Yekhanurov, Prime Minister of Ukraine (2005–2006)
Viktor Yanukovych, Prime Minister of Ukraine (2006–2007)

Monarch – Elizabeth II, Queen of the United Kingdom (1952–present)
Prime Minister – Tony Blair, Prime Minister of the United Kingdom (1997–2007)
 (Crown dependency of the United Kingdom)
Lieutenant-Governor – Sir Paul Haddacks, Lieutenant Governor of the Isle of Man (2005–2011)
Chief Minister –
Donald Gelling, Chief Minister of the Isle of Man (2004–2006)
Tony Brown, Chief Minister of the Isle of Man (2006–2011)
 (Crown dependency of the United Kingdom)
Lieutenant-Governor – Sir Fabian Malbon, Lieutenant Governor of Guernsey (2005–2011)
Chief Minister – Laurie Morgan, Chief Minister of Guernsey (2004–2007)
 (Crown dependency of the United Kingdom)
Lieutenant-Governor –
Sir John Cheshire, Lieutenant Governor of Jersey (2001–2006)
Andrew Ridgway, Lieutenant Governor of Jersey (2006–2011)
Chief Minister – Frank Walker, Chief Minister of Jersey (2005–2008)
 (Overseas Territory of the United Kingdom)
Governor –
Sir Francis Richards, Governor of Gibraltar (2003–2006)
Philip Barton, Acting Governor of Gibraltar (2006)
Sir Robert Fulton, Governor of Gibraltar (2006–2009)
Chief Minister – Peter Caruana, Chief Minister of Gibraltar (1996–2011)

Monarch – Pope Benedict XVI, Sovereign of Vatican City (2005–2013)
Head of Government –
Cardinal Edmund Szoka, President of the Governorate of Vatican City (1997–2006)
Archbishop Giovanni Lajolo, President of the Governorate of Vatican City (2006–2011)
Holy See (sui generis subject of public international law)
Secretary of State –
Cardinal Angelo Sodano, Cardinal Secretary of State (1990–2006)
Cardinal Tarcisio Bertone, Cardinal Secretary of State (2006–2013)

North America
 (Overseas Territory of the United Kingdom)
Governor –
Alan Huckle, Governor of Anguilla (2004–2006)
Mark Andrew Capes, Acting Governor of Anguilla (2006)
Andrew George, Governor of Anguilla (2006–2009)
Chief Minister – Osbourne Fleming, Chief Minister of Anguilla (2000–2010)

Monarch – Elizabeth II, Queen of Antigua and Barbuda (1981–present)
Governor-General – Sir James Carlisle, Governor-General of Antigua and Barbuda (1993–2007)
Prime Minister – Baldwin Spencer, Prime Minister of Antigua and Barbuda (2004–2014)
 (constituent country of the Kingdom of the Netherlands)
Governor – Fredis Refunjol, Governor of Aruba (2004–2016)
Prime Minister – Nelson Oduber, Prime Minister of Aruba (2001–2009)

Monarch – Elizabeth II, Queen of the Bahamas (1973–present)
Governor-General –
Paul Adderley, Acting Governor-General of the Bahamas (2005–2006)
Arthur Dion Hanna, Governor-General of the Bahamas (2006–2010)
Prime Minister – Perry Christie, Prime Minister of the Bahamas (2002–2007)

Monarch – Elizabeth II, Queen of Barbados (1966–2021)
Governor-General – Sir Clifford Husbands, Governor-General of Barbados (1996–2011)
Prime Minister – Owen Arthur, Prime Minister of Barbados (1994–2008)

Monarch – Elizabeth II, Queen of Belize (1981–present)
Governor-General – Sir Colville Young, Governor-General of Belize (1993–2021)
Prime Minister – Said Musa, Prime Minister of Belize (1998–2008)
 (Overseas Territory of the United Kingdom)
Governor – Sir John Vereker, Governor of Bermuda (2002–2007)
Premier –
Alex Scott, Premier of Bermuda (2003–2006)
Ewart Brown, Premier of Bermuda (2006–2010)
 (Overseas Territory of the United Kingdom)
Governor –
Tom Macan, Governor of the British Virgin Islands (2002–2006)
Dancia Penn, Acting Governor of the British Virgin Islands (2006)
David Pearey, Governor of the British Virgin Islands (2006–2010)
Chief Minister – Orlando Smith, Chief Minister of the British Virgin Islands (2003–2007)

Monarch – Elizabeth II, Queen of Canada (1952–present)
Governor-General – Michaëlle Jean, Governor General of Canada (2005–2010)
Prime Minister –
Paul Martin, Prime Minister of Canada (2003–2006)
Stephen Harper, Prime Minister of Canada (2006–2015)
 (Overseas Territory of the United Kingdom)
Governor – Stuart Jack, Governor of the Cayman Islands (2005–2009)
Head of Government – Kurt Tibbetts, Leader of Government Business of the Cayman Islands (2005–2009)

President –
Abel Pacheco, President of Costa Rica (2002–2006)
Óscar Arias, President of Costa Rica (2006–2010)

Communist Party Leader –
 Fidel Castro, First Secretary of the Communist Party of Cuba (1965–2011)
 Raúl Castro, Acting First Secretary of the Communist Party of Cuba (2006–2011)
President –
Fidel Castro, President of the Council of State of Cuba (1976–2008)
Raúl Castro, Acting President of the Council of State of Cuba (2006–2008)
Premier –
Fidel Castro, President of the Council of Ministers of Cuba (1959–2008)
Raúl Castro, Acting President of the Council of Ministers of Cuba (2006–2008)

President – Nicholas Liverpool, President of Dominica (2003–2012)
Prime Minister – Roosevelt Skerrit, Prime Minister of Dominica (2004–present)

President – Leonel Fernández, President of the Dominican Republic (2004–2012)

President – Antonio Saca, President of El Salvador (2004–2009)

Monarch – Elizabeth II, Queen of Grenada (1974–present)
Governor-General – Sir Daniel Williams, Governor-General of Grenada (1996–2008)
Prime Minister – Keith Mitchell, Prime Minister of Grenada (1995–2008)

President – Óscar Berger, President of Guatemala (2004–2008)

President –
Boniface Alexandre, President of Haiti (2004–2006)
René Préval, President of Haiti (2006–2011)
Prime Minister –
Gérard Latortue, Prime Minister of Haiti (2004–2006)
Jacques-Édouard Alexis, Prime Minister of Haiti (2006–2008)

President –
Ricardo Maduro, President of Honduras (2002–2006)
Manuel Zelaya, President of Honduras (2006–2009)

Monarch – Elizabeth II, Queen of Jamaica (1962–present)
Governor-General –
Sir Howard Cooke, Governor-General of Jamaica (1991–2006)
Kenneth O. Hall, Governor-General of Jamaica (2006–2009)
Prime Minister –
P. J. Patterson, Prime Minister of Jamaica (1992–2006)
Portia Simpson-Miller, Prime Minister of Jamaica (2006–2007)

President –
Vicente Fox, President of Mexico (2000–2006)
Felipe Calderón, President of Mexico (2006–2012)
 (Overseas Territory of the United Kingdom)
Governor – Deborah Barnes-Jones, Governor of Montserrat (2004–2007)
Chief Minister –
John Osborne, Chief Minister of Montserrat (2001–2006)
Lowell Lewis, Chief Minister of Montserrat (2006–2009)
 (constituent country of the Kingdom of the Netherlands)
Governor – Frits Goedgedrag, Governor of the Netherlands Antilles (2002–2010)
Prime Minister –
Etienne Ys, Prime Minister of the Netherlands Antilles (2004–2006)
Emily de Jongh-Elhage, Prime Minister of the Netherlands Antilles (2006–2010)

President – Enrique Bolaños, President of Nicaragua (2002–2007)

President – Martín Torrijos, President of Panama (2004–2009)

Monarch – Elizabeth II, Queen of Saint Kitts and Nevis (1983–present)
Governor-General – Sir Cuthbert Sebastian, Governor-General of Saint Kitts and Nevis (1996–2013)
Prime Minister – Denzil Douglas, Prime Minister of Saint Kitts and Nevis (1995–2015)

Monarch – Elizabeth II, Queen of Saint Lucia (1979–present)
Governor-General – Dame Pearlette Louisy, Governor-General of Saint Lucia (1997–2017)
Prime Minister –
Kenny Anthony, Prime Minister of Saint Lucia (1997–2006)
Sir John Compton, Prime Minister of Saint Lucia (2006–2007)
  (overseas collectivity of France)
Prefect –
Albert Dupuy, Prefect of Saint Pierre and Miquelon (2005–2006)
Yves Fauqueur, Prefect of Saint Pierre and Miquelon (2006–2008)
Head of Government –
Paul Jaccachury, Acting President of the General Council of Saint Pierre and Miquelon (2005–2006)
Charles Dodeman, President of the General Council of Saint Pierre and Miquelon (2006)
Stéphane Artano, President of the General Council of Saint Pierre and Miquelon (2006–2018)

Monarch – Elizabeth II, Queen of Saint Vincent and the Grenadines (1979–present)
Governor-General – Sir Frederick Ballantyne, Governor-General of Saint Vincent and the Grenadines (2002–2019)
Prime Minister – Ralph Gonsalves, Prime Minister of Saint Vincent and the Grenadines (2001–present)

President – George Maxwell Richards, President of Trinidad and Tobago (2003–2013)
Prime Minister – Patrick Manning, Prime Minister of Trinidad and Tobago (2001–2010)
 (Overseas Territory of the United Kingdom)
Governor – Richard Tauwhare, Governor of the Turks and Caicos Islands (2005–2008)
Premier – Michael Misick, Premier of the Turks and Caicos Islands (2003–2009)

President – George W. Bush, President of the United States (2001–2009)
 (Commonwealth of the United States)
Governor – Aníbal Acevedo Vilá, Governor of Puerto Rico (2005–2009)
 (insular area of the United States)
Governor – Charles Wesley Turnbull, Governor of the United States Virgin Islands (1999–2007)

Oceania
 (unorganised, unincorporated territory of the United States)
Governor – Togiola Tulafono, Governor of American Samoa (2003–2013)

Monarch – Elizabeth II, Queen of Australia (1952–present)
Governor-General – Michael Jeffery, Governor-General of Australia (2003–2008)
Prime Minister – John Howard, Prime Minister of Australia (1996–2007)
 (external territory of Australia)
Administrator – Neil Lucas, Administrator of Christmas Island (2006–2008)
Shire-President – Gordon Thomson, Shire president of Christmas Island (2003–2011)
 (external territory of Australia)
Administrator – Neil Lucas, Administrator of the Cocos (Keeling) Islands (2006–2008)
Shire-President – Ronald Grant, Shire president of the Cocos (Keeling) Islands (2001–2007)
 (self-governing territory of Australia)
Administrator – Grant Tambling, Administrator of Norfolk Island (2003–2007)
Chief Minister –
Geoffrey Robert Gardner, Chief Minister of Norfolk Island (2001–2006)
David Buffett, Chief Minister of Norfolk Island (2006–2007)

President –
Ratu Josefa Iloilo, President of Fiji (2000–2006)
Frank Bainimarama, Acting President of Fiji (2006–2007)
Prime Minister –
Laisenia Qarase, Prime Minister of Fiji (2001–2006)
Jona Senilagakali, Acting Prime Minister of Fiji (2006–2007)
  (overseas collectivity of France)
High Commissioner – Anne Bouquet, High Commissioner of the Republic in French Polynesia (2005–2008)
President –
Oscar Temaru, President of French Polynesia (2005–2006)
Gaston Tong Sang, President of French Polynesia (2006–2007)
 (insular area of the United States)
Governor – Felix Perez Camacho, Governor of Guam (2003–2011)

President – Anote Tong, President of Kiribati (2003–2016)

President – Kessai Note, President of the Marshall Islands (2000–2008)

President – Joseph Urusemal, President of Micronesia (2003–2007)

President – Ludwig Scotty, President of Nauru (2004–2007)
 (sui generis collectivity of France)
High Commissioner – Michel Mathieu, High Commissioner of New Caledonia (2005–2007)
Head of Government – Marie-Noëlle Thémereau, President of the Government of New Caledonia (2004–2007)

Monarch – Elizabeth II, Queen of New Zealand (1952–present)
Governor-General –
Dame Silvia Cartwright, Governor-General of New Zealand (2001–2006)
Dame Sian Elias, Administrator of the Government of New Zealand (2006)
Sir Anand Satyanand, Governor-General of New Zealand (2006–2011)
Prime Minister – Helen Clark, Prime Minister of New Zealand (1999–2008)
 (associated state of New Zealand)
Queen's Representative – Sir Frederick Tutu Goodwin, Queen's Representative of the Cook Islands (2001–2013)
Prime Minister – Jim Marurai, Prime Minister of the Cook Islands (2004–2010)
 (associated state of New Zealand)
Premier – Young Vivian, Premier of Niue (2002–2008)
Tokelau (dependent territory of New Zealand)
Administrator –
Neil Walter, Administrator of Tokelau (2003–2006)
David Payton, Administrator of Tokelau (2006–2009)
Head of Government –
Pio Tuia, Head of Government of Tokelau (2005–2006)
Kolouei O'Brien, Head of Government of Tokelau (2006–2007)
 (Commonwealth of the United States)
Governor –
Juan Babauta, Governor of the Northern Mariana Islands (2002–2006)
Benigno Fitial, Governor of the Northern Mariana Islands (2006–2013)

President – Tommy Remengesau, President of Palau (2001–2009)

Monarch – Elizabeth II, Queen of Papua New Guinea (1975–present)
Governor-General – Sir Paulias Matane, Governor-General of Papua New Guinea (2004–2010)
Prime Minister – Sir Michael Somare, Prime Minister of Papua New Guinea (2002–2010)
 (Overseas Territory of the United Kingdom)
Governor –
Richard Fell, Governor of the Pitcairn Islands (2001–2006)
George Fergusson, Governor of the Pitcairn Islands (2006–2010)
Mayor – Jay Warren, Mayor of the Pitcairn Islands (2005–2007)

Head of State – Malietoa Tanumafili II, O le Ao o le Malo of Samoa (1962–2007)
Prime Minister – Tuilaepa Aiono Sailele Malielegaoi, Prime Minister of Samoa (1998–2021)

Monarch – Elizabeth II, Queen of the Solomon Islands (1978–present)
Governor-General – Sir Nathaniel Waena, Governor-General of the Solomon Islands (2004–2009)
Prime Minister –
Sir Allan Kemakeza, Prime Minister of the Solomon Islands (2001–2006)
Snyder Rini, Prime Minister of the Solomon Islands (2006)
Manasseh Sogavare, Prime Minister of the Solomon Islands (2006–2007)

Monarch –
Tāufaʻāhau Tupou IV, King of Tonga (1965–2006)
George Tupou V, King of Tonga (2006–2012)
Prime Minister –
Prince Lavaka Ata ʻUlukālala, Prime Minister of Tonga (2000–2006)
Feleti Sevele, Prime Minister of Tonga (2006–2010)

Monarch – Elizabeth II, Queen of Tuvalu (1978–present)
Governor-General – Filoimea Telito, Governor-General of Tuvalu (2005–2010)
Prime Minister –
Maatia Toafa, Prime Minister of Tuvalu (2004–2006)
Apisai Ielemia, Prime Minister of Tuvalu (2006–2010)

President – Kalkot Mataskelekele, President of Vanuatu (2004–2009)
Prime Minister – Ham Lini, Prime Minister of Vanuatu (2004–2008)
  (overseas collectivity of France)
Administrator –
Xavier de Fürst, Administrator Superior of Wallis and Futuna (2005–2006)
Richard Didier, Administrator Superior of Wallis and Futuna (2006–2008)
Head of Government – Emeni Simete, President of the Territorial Assembly of Wallis and Futuna (2005–2007)

South America

President – Néstor Kirchner, President of Argentina (2003–2007)

President –
Eduardo Rodríguez, President of Bolivia (2005–2006)
Evo Morales, President of Bolivia (2006–2019)

President – Luiz Inácio Lula da Silva, President of Brazil (2003–2010)

President –
Ricardo Lagos, President of Chile (2000–2006)
Michelle Bachelet, President of Chile (2006–2010)

President – Álvaro Uribe, President of Colombia (2002–2010)

President – Alfredo Palacio, President of Ecuador (2005–2007)
 (Overseas Territory of the United Kingdom)
Governor –
Howard Pearce, Governor of the Falkland Islands (2002–2006)
Harriet Hall, Acting Governor of the Falkland Islands (2006)
Alan Huckle, Governor of the Falkland Islands (2006–2010)
Head of Government – Chris Simpkins, Chief Executive of the Falkland Islands (2003–2007)

President – Bharrat Jagdeo, President of Guyana (1999–2011)
Prime Minister – Sam Hinds, Prime Minister of Guyana (1999–2015)

President – Nicanor Duarte, President of Paraguay (2003–2008)

President –
Alejandro Toledo, President of Peru (2001–2006)
Alan García, President of Peru (2006–2011)
Prime Minister –
Pedro Pablo Kuczynski, President of the Council of Ministers of Peru (2005–2006)
Jorge Del Castillo, President of the Council of Ministers of Peru (2006–2008)

President – Ronald Venetiaan, President of Suriname (2000–2010)

President – Tabaré Vázquez, President of Uruguay (2005–2010)
 
President – Hugo Chávez, President of Venezuela (2002–2013)

Notes

External links
Rulersa list of rulers throughout time and places
WorldStatesmenan online encyclopedia of the leaders of nations and territories

State leaders
State leaders
State leaders
2006